Dinah Washington (born Ruth Lee Jones; August 29, 1924 – December 14, 1963) was an American singer and pianist, one of the most popular black female recording artists of the 1950s.  Primarily a jazz vocalist, she performed and recorded in a wide variety of styles including blues, R&B, and traditional pop music, and gave herself the title of "Queen of the Blues". She was a 1986 inductee of the Alabama Jazz Hall of Fame, and was inducted into the Rock and Roll Hall of Fame in 1993.

Early life
Ruth Lee Jones was born in Tuscaloosa, Alabama, to Alice and Ollie Jones, and moved to Chicago as a child. She became deeply involved in gospel music and played piano for the choir in St. Luke's Baptist Church while still in elementary school. She sang gospel music in church and played piano, directing her church choir in her teens and was a member of the Sallie Martin Gospel Singers. When she joined the Sallie Martin group, she dropped out of Wendell Phillips High School. She sang lead with the first female gospel singers formed by Sallie Martin, who was co-founder of the Gospel Singers Convention. Her involvement with the gospel choir occurred after she won an amateur contest at Chicago's Regal Theater where she sang "I Can't Face the Music".

Career
After winning a talent contest at the age of 15, she began performing in clubs. By 1941–42 she was performing in such Chicago clubs as Dave's Café and the Downbeat Room of the Sherman Hotel (with Fats Waller). She was playing at the Three Deuces, a jazz club, when a friend took her to hear Billie Holiday at the Garrick Stage Bar. Club owner Joe Sherman was so impressed with her singing of "I Understand", backed by the Cats and the Fiddle, who were appearing in the Garrick's upstairs room, that he hired her. During her year at the Garrick—she sang upstairs while Holiday performed in the downstairs room—she acquired the name by which she became known. She credited Joe Sherman with suggesting the change from Ruth Jones, made before Lionel Hampton came to hear Dinah at the Garrick. Hampton's visit brought an offer, and Washington worked as his female band vocalist after she had sung with the band for its opening at the Chicago Regal Theatre.

She made her recording debut for the Keynote label that December with "Evil Gal Blues", written by Leonard Feather and backed by Hampton and musicians from his band, including Joe Morris (trumpet) and Milt Buckner (piano). Both that record and its follow-up, "Salty Papa Blues", made the Billboard "Harlem Hit Parade" in 1944.  In December 1945 she made a series of twelve recordings for Apollo Records, 10 of which were issued, featuring the Lucky Thompson All Stars.

She stayed with Hampton's band until 1946, after the Keynote label folded, and signed for Mercury Records as a solo singer. Her first record for Mercury, a version of Fats Waller's "Ain't Misbehavin'", was another hit, starting a long string of success. Between 1948 and 1955, she had 27 R&B top-10 hits, making her one of the most popular and successful singers of the period. Both "Am I Asking Too Much" (1948) and "Baby Get Lost" (1949) reached Number 1 on the R&B chart, and her version of "I Wanna Be Loved" (1950) crossed over to reach Number 22 on the US pop chart. Her hit recordings included blues, standards, novelties, pop covers, and even a version of Hank Williams' "Cold, Cold Heart" (R&B Number 3, 1951). At the same time as her biggest popular success, she also recorded sessions with many leading jazz musicians, including Clifford Brown and Clark Terry on the album Dinah Jams (1954), and also recorded with Cannonball Adderley and Ben Webster.

In 1950, Dinah Washington performed at the sixth famed Cavalcade of Jazz concert held at Wrigley Field in Los Angeles which was produced by Leon Hefflin, Sr. on June 25. Also featured on the same day were Lionel Hampton, PeeWee Crayton's Orchestra, Roy Milton and his Orchestra, Tiny Davis and Her Hell Divers, and other artists. There were 16,000 reported to be in attendance, and the concert ended early because of a fracas while Lionel Hampton played "Flying High". Washington returned to perform at the twelfth Cavalcade of Jazz also at Wrigley Field in Los Angeles on September 2, 1956. Also performing that day were Little Richard, The Mel Williams Dots, Julie Stevens, Chuck Higgin's Orchestra, Bo Rhambo, Willie Hayden & Five Black Birds, The Premiers, Gerald Wilson and His 20-Pc. Recording Orchestra and Jerry Gray and his Orchestra.

In 1959, she had her first top ten pop hit, with a version of "What a Diff'rence a Day Made", which made Number 4 on the US pop chart. Her band at that time included arranger and conductor Belford Hendricks, with Kenny Burrell (guitar), Joe Zawinul (piano), and Panama Francis (drums). She followed it up with a version of Irving Gordon's "Unforgettable", and then two highly successful duets in 1960 with Brook Benton, "Baby (You've Got What It Takes)" (No. 5 Pop, No. 1 R&B) and "A Rockin' Good Way (To Mess Around and Fall in Love)" (No. 7 Pop, No. 1 R&B).  Her last big hit was "September in the Rain" in 1961 (No. 23 Pop, No. 5 R&B).

Washington notably performed two numbers in the dirty blues genre. The songs were "Long John Blues" about her dentist, with lyrics like "He took out his trusty drill. Told me to open wide. He said he wouldn't hurt me, but he filled my whole inside." She also recorded a song called "Big Long Slidin' Thing", supposedly about a trombonist.

One source states that Washington "produced 45 R&B-charted hits between 1948 and 1961, including 16 Top 15 placements between 1948 and 1950".

In the 1950s and early 1960s before her death, Washington occasionally performed on the Las Vegas Strip. Tony Bennett said of Washington during a recording session with Amy Winehouse: 

According to Richard S. Ginell at AllMusic:

Washington was well known for singing torch songs. In 1962, Dinah hired a male backing trio called the Allegros, consisting of Jimmy Thomas on drums, Earl Edwards on sax, and Jimmy Sigler on organ. Edwards was replaced on sax by John Payne. A Variety writer praised their vocals as "effective choruses".

Washington's achievements included appearances at the Newport Jazz Festival (1955–1959), the Randalls Island Jazz Festival in New York City (1959), and the International Jazz Festival in Washington, D.C. (1962), frequent gigs at Birdland (1958, 1961–1962), and performances in 1963 with Count Basie and Duke Ellington.

Personal life and death

Washington was married six times.

Early in the morning of December 14, 1963, Washington's sixth husband, football great Dick "Night Train" Lane, went to sleep with Washington and awoke later to find her slumped over and not responsive. Dr. B. C. Ross pronounced her dead at the scene at age 39. An autopsy later showed a lethal combination of secobarbital and amobarbital, prescriptions for her insomnia and diet, which contributed to her death. She is buried in the Burr Oak Cemetery in Alsip, Illinois.

Awards
Grammy Award

Grammy Hall of Fame
Recordings by Dinah Washington were inducted into the Grammy Hall of Fame, which is a special Grammy award established in 1973 to honor recordings that are at least twenty-five years old, and that have "qualitative or historical significance."

Rock and Roll Hall of Fame
The Rock and Roll Hall of Fame listed her "TV Is the Thing (This Year)" as one of the songs that shaped rock and roll.

Honors and Inductions
 Unforgettable: A Tribute to Dinah Washington is a 1964 album recorded by Aretha Franklin as a tribute.
 In 1993, the U.S. Post Office issued a Dinah Washington 29 cent commemorative postage stamp.
 In 2005, the Board of Commissioners renamed a park, near where Washington had lived in Chicago in the 1950s, Dinah Washington Park in her honor.
 In 2008, the city of Tuscaloosa, Alabama, Washington's birthplace, renamed the section of 30th Avenue between 15th Street and Kaulton Park "Dinah Washington Avenue." The unveiling ceremony for the new name took place on March 12, 2009, with Washington's son Robert Grayson and three of her grandchildren in attendance.
 On August 29, 2013, the city of Tuscaloosa also dedicated the former Allen Jemison Hardware building, on the northwest corner of Greensboro Avenue and 7th Street (620 Greensboro Avenue), as the newly renovated Dinah Washington Cultural Arts Center."

Album discography

References

Further reading
 Queen: The Life and Music of Dinah Washington, Nadine Cohodas, 2004, Pantheon 
 Queen of the Blues: A Biography of Dinah Washington, Jim Haskins, 1987, William Morrow & Co. 
 Top Pop Records 1955–1972, Joel Whitburn, 1973, Record Research.

External links
 Dinah Washington : Home, Verve Music Group
 

American blues singers
American jazz singers
1924 births
1963 deaths
Grammy Award winners
Grammy Hall of Fame Award recipients
20th-century African-American women singers
African-American jazz musicians
American women jazz singers
American gospel singers
Dirty blues musicians
Torch singers
People from Tuscaloosa, Alabama
Apollo Records artists
EmArcy Records artists
Mercury Records artists
Roulette Records artists
Alabama Democrats
Illinois Democrats
Michigan Democrats
Accidental deaths in Michigan
Drug-related deaths in Michigan
Barbiturates-related deaths
Baptists from Alabama
Singers from Alabama
Singers from Chicago
20th-century American singers
20th-century American women singers
Ballad musicians
Jazz musicians from Illinois
Jazz musicians from Alabama
20th-century Baptists
Burials at Burr Oak Cemetery